Unknown Woman is a 2017 South Korean television series starring Oh Ji-eun,
Bae Jong-ok, Park Yoon-jae, Seo Ji-seok, and Choi Yoon-so. The series aired on KBS2 on Monday to Friday from 7:50 p.m. to 8:30 p.m. (KST).

Cast

Main
 Oh Ji-eun as Son Yeo-ri / Yoon Seol
 Bae Jong-ok as Hong Ji-won
 Park Yoon-jae as Goo Do-chi
 Jung Yoo-geun as young Do-chi
 Seo Ji-seok as Kim Moo-yeol
 Choi Yoon-so as Goo Hae-joo

Supporting

People around Yeo-ri / Yoon Seol
 Han Kap-soo as Son Joo-ho
Yeo-ri's adoptive father.
 Seo Kwon-soon as Seo Mal-nyeon
Yoon Seol's mother.
 Sun Dong-hyuk as Yoon Ki-dong
Yoon Seol's father.
 Park Joon-hyuk as Oliver Jang
Yoon Seol's ex-fiancé; Ae-nok's boyfriend.

People around Ji-won
 Byun Woo-min as Goo Do-young
Ji-won's husband.
 Joo Seung-hyuk as Goo Hae-sung
Do-young's and Ji-won's son, Hae-joo's stepbrother.

People around Moo-yeol
 Bang Eun-hee as Jang Ae-nok
Moo-yeol's mother.
 Lee In-ha as Kim Yeol-mae
Moo-yeol's sister.
 Choi Hyun-joon as Kim Ga-ya
Moo-yeol's and Hae-joo's son.
 Kim Ji-an as Kim Ma-ya / Son Bom
Moo-yeol's and Yeo-ri's daughter.

People around Do-chi
 Yeo Hoon-min as Jjang-goo
Do-chi's friend.

Extended
 Han Ji-woo as Han So-ra
Do-chi's ex-fiancée.
 Sora Jung as Choi Mi-hee (Angela Choi)
 Hae-joo's biological mother, Do-young's ex-wife.
 Kim Tae-young as Kim Joon-myung
Hae-sung's family doctor.
 Kim Ji-eun as Lee Hwa-young
Woman who falsely accused Do-chi.
 Jo Seon-mook as Kim Jae-goo
Wid Group's lawyer.
 Jo Ye-rin as Kim Bom (Kelly Kim)
Ma-ya's friend.
 Park So-jung as Kim Soon-mi
Kim Bom's mother.
 Kim Sa-hee as Cellist
Do-young's mistress.
 Jo Sung-hee as Secretary Kim
 Kim Kwang-hyun as Doctor
 Moon Woo-jin as Hysterical Child

Ratings 
 In this table,  represent the lowest ratings and  represent the highest ratings.

Awards and nominations

References

External links
  
 

Korean Broadcasting System television dramas
2017 South Korean television series debuts
2017 South Korean television series endings
Korean-language television shows
Television series by Pan Entertainment
Television series about revenge